Senjittale En Kadhala ( She's Ended My Love) is a 2017 Indian Tamil-language romantic drama film written and directed by Ezhil Durai. He also features in the lead role opposite Madhumila, while Abhinaya and Mime Gopi among others play supporting roles. The film began production during early 2016 and was released on 7 April 2017.

Cast
 Ezhil Durai as Veera
 Madhumila as Anushka
 Abhinaya as Sona
 Arjunan
 "Kayal" Vincent
 Vanitha Hariharan
 Divya
 Rama as Veera's Mother
 Ajay Rathnam as Veera's father
 Mime Gopi as Dhamodaran
 Mahanadi Shankar
 Cool Suresh

Production
Ezhil Durai chose to make his first feature film after working in almost fifty short films. Production began in mid-2016, with the film initially wrongly reported in the media to be based on the murder of a young working professional by a stalker in Chennai. Ezhil refuted the claims and revealed it was a romantic comedy, with actresses Madhumila and Abhinaya working alongside him. The film was also dubbed into Telugu as 100% Break Up soon after the original Tamil version had been completed. The makers initially targeted to release the film around Valentine's Day but postponements meant that they settled for an April release.

Soundtrack

The film's music was composed by Raj Bharath, while the audio rights of the film was acquired by VMS Music Records. The album released on 31 January 2017 and featured seven songs.

Release
The film opened on 7 April 2017 across Tamil Nadu alongside Mani Ratnam's Kaatru Veliyidai. The Times of India wrote "there is an earnestness about Senjittale En Kadhala that gives the film some appeal, but the filmmaking lacks zing" and that "we can sense a gap between the writing and the execution and often, this comes in the way of us fully immersing ourselves into it". A critic from The New Indian Express wrote "the writing is simple and Ezhil approaches all aspects in earnest" but "there's inconsistency in presentation and since most of the artistes are newbies, it lacks the fizz - a regular ingredient of new time writers".

References

External links
 

2017 films
2010s Tamil-language films
Indian romantic drama films
2017 directorial debut films
2017 romantic drama films